Glen Motz  (born 1958) is a Canadian politician who was re-elected for his second term to the House of Commons of Canada in the 2019 Canadian federal election on October 21, 2019. Motz was first elected in a by-election on October 24, 2016 after the death of former MP Jim Hillyer. He represents the electoral district of Medicine Hat—Cardston—Warner as a member of the Conservative Party of Canada.

Personal life

Prior to his election, Motz served for 35 years with the Medicine Hat Police Service and retired as Inspector in 2015.

Motz attended Hillcrest Christian College circa 1976 in Medicine Hat, which has since merged with the Mountain View Bible College to form the Rocky Mountain College, Calgary, an affiliate of  the Evangelical Missionary Church of Canada. He earned a Bachelor of Religious Education Degree from the Medicine Hat College in 1980. In that same year, Motz was called to his policing career in Medicine Hat.

Political career

In 2017, Glen Motz was promoted to Deputy Shadow Minister for Public Safety and Emergency Preparedness. After the 2019 election, he was named the Associate Shadow Minister for Public Safety and Emergency Preparedness. Motz was re-elected again in 2021.

Electoral record

References

External links

Conservative Party of Canada MPs
Members of the House of Commons of Canada from Alberta
People from Medicine Hat
Living people
21st-century Canadian politicians
1958 births